John William Carter (born July 3, 1947) is an American businessman and politician who unsuccessfully ran for the United States Senate in Nevada in 2006, losing to John Ensign in the general election. He is the eldest child of former President Jimmy Carter and First Lady Rosalynn Carter.

Early life and education
Carter was born at the Naval Medical Center Portsmouth in Portsmouth, Virginia. Raised in Plains, Georgia, he spent winters working at his father's peanut farm warehouse, where his wages began at 10 cents per hour. Carter struggled when he first entered college in 1965, attending Georgia Institute of Technology, Emory University, and Georgia Southwestern State University before enlisting in the United States Navy in April 1968 at the suggestion of his father. Carter served during the Vietnam War, on the salvage ship . He received a "less than honorable" general discharge in late 1970 after he and 53 classmates were caught smoking marijuana at the Naval Reactors Facility in Idaho Falls, Idaho. Carter returned to Georgia Tech, earning a degree in nuclear physics. Following graduation, he immediately entered the University of Georgia School of Law, receiving his Juris Doctor in 1975. 

In 1985, he was interviewed by David Wallechinsky for his book, "Midterm Report: The Class of '65: Chronicles Of An American Generation" (1986). It was later published as "Class Reunion '65, Tales of an American Generation," written from the perspective of two decades post-high school graduation. Twenty-eight then-contemporary high school graduates were interviewed, Wallachinsky noting the profound impact of the war on Vietnam on their lives.

Career 
In 1981, Carter moved to Chicago, where he worked for the Chicago Board of Trade and Citibank.

2006 senatorial campaign

Carter moved to Nevada in 2002 and ran unsuccessfully for a seat in the United States Senate as a Democrat against incumbent Republican Senator John Ensign of Nevada in the 2006 election. Carter won the Democratic nomination on August 15, 2006, against opponent Ruby Jee Tun, a teacher from Carson City.

Carter's primary issues were his opposition to the Iraq War and his concerns about the healthcare system, especially what he characterized as its failure to meet its commitment to veterans.

Personal life 
Stepson John Chuldenko, from Brasfield's first marriage, is a film director and has directed television ads for the campaign; stepdaughter Sarah Reynolds (née Chuldenko) is a book illustrator (for Jimmy Carter's poetry volume) and painter who has worked with Jeff Koons, and is married to Australian artist Stephen Reynolds.

References

External links
 "Oral History with Jack Carter"—interview on June 25, 2003
 USS Grapple (ARS 7) website
 Jack Carter's Facebook account

1947 births
American anti–Iraq War activists
United States Navy personnel of the Vietnam War
Carter family
Children of presidents of the United States
Georgia Southwestern State University alumni
Georgia Tech alumni
Living people
Military personnel from Georgia (U.S. state)
Nevada Democrats
People from Plains, Georgia
Politicians from Portsmouth, Virginia
United States Navy sailors
University of Georgia School of Law alumni